Lena: The Bride of Ice is a 2008 British drama film that was directed by Polly Steele.

References

External links
 

British drama films
2000s English-language films
2000s British films